The Halmahera cuckooshrike or Halmahera cicadabird (Edolisoma parvulum) is a species of bird in the family Campephagidae.
It is found in the northern Maluku Islands.

Its natural habitat is subtropical or tropical moist lowland forest.

References

Halmahera cuckooshrike
Birds of Halmahera
Halmahera cuckooshrike
Taxonomy articles created by Polbot
Taxobox binomials not recognized by IUCN